Larry Hopkins may refer to:

Larry Hopkins (ice hockey) (born 1954), Canadian professional ice hockey player
Larry J. Hopkins (1933-2021), American politician who served in the Kentucky House of Representatives
Larry Mitchell Hopkins (born 1950) leader of the United Constitutional Patriots militia group in New Mexico